Dawson Saddle is a saddle and mountain pass over the San Gabriel Mountains located in northeastern Los Angeles County, California, United States. At , it is the highest point along the Angeles Crest Highway and the second highest mountain pass in Southern California after Onyx Summit.

Geography
Dawson Saddle lies between Mount Lewis to the north and Throop Peak to the southeast.

The saddle is accessible via State Route 2 (Angeles Crest Highway) or by foot along Dawson Saddle Trail, a branch of the Pacific Crest Trail. Vehicle access during the winter months is restricted due to heavy snowfall.

See also
Islip Saddle

References

Landforms of Los Angeles County, California
San Gabriel Mountains
Mountain passes of California